Karen Dunn Kelley is an American financial investment manager and government official who served as Deputy Secretary of Commerce from 2018 to 2021. Prior to her appointment to the Department of Commerce, she was senior managing director of investments at Invesco.

Education 
Kelley earned a Bachelor of Science degree from the Villanova School of Business at Villanova University.

Career

Finance 
Kelley began her career at Drexel Burnham Lambert, where she worked on the Fixed Income High Grade Retail Desk and eventually became vice president in the bond department. She joined Invesco in 1989 as a money market portfolio manager. In 1992, Kelley became chief money market and government officer at the company. In 2007, she was named head of Invesco's fixed income and cash management team. In 2011, she became the firm's senior managing director of investments.

U.S. Department of Commerce 
Kelley was unanimously confirmed by the U.S. Senate to serve as Under Secretary of Commerce for Economic Affairs on August 3, 2017, and she was subsequently sworn in on September 22, 2017. She assumed the duties of acting Deputy Secretary of Commerce upon being sworn in to the position of Undersecretary. President Donald Trump later announced on June 4, 2018, that Kelley would be nominated to serve full-time in the position of Deputy Secretary. The United States Senate confirmed Kelley to be Deputy Secretary of the Department of Commerce in a 62–38 vote on November 28, 2018.

Personal life 
Kelley is married to Joseph L. Kelley, a physician. The couple have three children.

References

External links
 Profile at Bloomberg
 

Living people
Trump administration personnel
United States Deputy Secretaries of Commerce
United States Under Secretaries of Commerce
Villanova University alumni
Year of birth missing (living people)